Guarea caulobotrys is a species of plant in the family Meliaceae. It is endemic to Colombia.

Taxonomy
The species was first described by José Cuatrecasas in 1950. Cuatrecasas spelt the epithet caulobotryis. However, -botrys used in a scientific name is a noun, so its ending does not change. , the International Plant Names Index used the spelling caulobotrys, noting the different initial spelling. This approach was followed by Tropicos and the International Union for Conservation of Nature, among others. The original spelling was also used.

References

caulobotrys
Plants described in 1950
Endemic flora of Colombia
Vulnerable plants
Taxonomy articles created by Polbot